Nzuddi are traditional cookies, typical of the Italian provinces of Messina and Catania. They are spherical, slightly flattened, golden-colored cookies, made of flour, sugar, almonds, cinnamon, egg whites and ammonia.

Historically, the cookies were made for the feast of Our Lady of the Letter, Saint Patron of the city of Messina, on June 3. These cakes were originally prepared in the monastery of the Vincentian Sisters, and the name 'nzuddi derives from the abbreviation of the name "Vincenzo" (Vincent) in Sicilian language.

See also

 Italian cuisine
 Sicilian cuisine  
 List of Sicilian dishes

References

Province of Catania
Metropolitan City of Messina
Cuisine of Sicily
Almond cookies
Cuisine of Messina